The Bangsamoro Islamic Freedom Fighters (BIFF), also known as the Bangsamoro Islamic Freedom Movement, is an Islamist militant organization based in Mindanao, the Philippines. It is a smaller player in the overall Moro insurgency in the Philippines and is mostly active in Maguindanao and other places in central Mindanao.  It is a breakaway group from the Moro Islamic Liberation Front founded by Ameril Umbra Kato. Following Kato's death, the group split into three factions, one of which has aligned with the Islamic State of Iraq and the Levant (ISIL), while the other two are less radical.

History

Foundation and operations under Ameril Umbra Kato 
Kato broke with the Moro Islamic Liberation Front (MILF) in 2008 because he disagreed with the MILF's acceptance of autonomy rather than full independence. In 2008, after the Philippine Supreme Court nullified the Memorandum of Agreement on Ancestral Domain signed by the Philippine government and the MILF, Kato led a contingent of MILF fighters in an attack against civilians.  In December 2010, Kato formed the BIFF. He claimed to have 5,000 fighters but the government said that he had only 300.  It was not until August 2011 that the MILF recognized the break and declared the BIFF a "lost command".

The BIFF rejected the 2012 Framework Agreement on the Bangsamoro, a preliminary peace agreement signed between the Government of the Philippines and the MILF, and vowed to continue their fight. In January 2014, after the final annexes of the Framework Agreement were signed, the Armed Forces of the Philippines launched Operation Darkhorse against the BIFF. The army captured the BIFF's main camp in Barangay Ganta, Shariff Saydona Mustapha, Maguindanao which reportedly had 500 fighters.

On February 4, 2014, the Moro National Liberation Front (MNLF) commander Habib Mujahab Hashim confirmed reports that the BIFF had forged an alliance with his group.

Along with the MILF, on January 25, 2015, the BIFF was involved in the 2015 Mamasapano clash, leading to the deaths of 44 members of the SAF, 18 from the MILF and five from the BIFF. Following the event, the group engaged in some clashes against the AFP, prompting AFP Chief of Staff Gregorio Pio Catapang to announce in late February 2015 an all-out offensive against the BIFF. The offensive resulted in more than 100 casualties in the BIFF. It also suffered a split when a commander Tambako formed the Justice for Islamic Movement to protect the foreign militants hiding in BIFF controlled areas. He was captured in General Santos City trying to escape the law.

In 2019, Malaysia listed the group as terrorist.

Split after Ameril Umbra Kato's death 
After founder Ameril Umbra Kato's death, BIFF's former vice-chairman for political affairs, Ismael Abubakar, alias "Imam Bongos", took over leadership of the group. Among the first moves of the BIFF under Abubakar was the bombing of an outpost of the Philippine Army and two different detachments of the Special Action Force (SAF) in Maguindanao on April 19, 2015. Over time, Ismael Abubakar began to increasingly adopt the radical ideology of the Islamic State of Iraq and the Levant (ISIL), and openly declared an alliance with ISIL in August 2015.

This development caused unrest among the group. As result, one commander of BIFF, Ustadz Karialan (alias "Imam Minimbang"), split from the group with his followers and formed a separate faction. This faction stated that "we are not to be swayed by the ISIS ideology because we adhere to the cause of the Moro struggle and teachings of the Koran". Despite this, disagreements over ideological trends continued in Ismael Abubakar's faction, with part of his followers regarding his stance as too moderate. These hardliners eventually left as well, forming the "Jamaatul al-Muhajireen wal-Ansar" wing of the group and electing Esmael Abdulmalik (alias "Abu Toraife") as leader. This most radical faction of BIFF has openly adopted ISIL's ideology.

Battle of Marawi and aftermath 
It is possible that BIFF participated in the Battle of Marawi of 2017. The Philippine military stated in May 2017 that BIFF fighters were among the Jihadists in the city, while Secretary of National Defense Delfin Lorenzana claimed in June 2017 that about 40 fighters of the group took part in the fighting. According to other reports, the group had not only contributed fighters to the battle, but also provided "logistical support" to the ISIL forces besieged in Marawi.

Nevertheless, a BIFF spokesman stated in June 2017 that though his group "welcomed" the offensive by the Maute group and Abu Sayyaf, BIFF's operations at the time were unrelated to the Battle of Marawi. Furthermore, the leader of the Moro Islamic Liberation Front Murad Ebrahim claimed in July 2018 that BIFF had not participated in the battle.
On 3 July three soldiers were injured and four militants after a gunfight in Datu Paglas, Maguindanao. Later on 29 July, nine BIFF members were killed after a gunfight which took place in Shariff Saydona Mustapha, Maguindanao.The militants killed were all followers of Abu Toraife, whose real name is Abdulmalik Esmael, General of one of three factions in the BIFF. Days after the authorities found militants training suicide bombers in Southern Philippines.

In May 2021, several BIFF fighters of the Karialan faction were killed in clashes with Philippine security forces. Between 50 to 200 BIFF militants occupied the market in Datu Paglas on 8 May 2021. The insurgents were led by Solaiman Tudon who was part of Ustadz Karialan's faction. The rebels were quickly expelled from Datu Paglas, and observers speculated that the Karialan faction had just wanted to demonstrate its continued combat capabilities through this operation.

Engagements
 Operation Darkhorse (2014)
 Mamasapano clash (2015)
 Marawi crisis (2017)

See also

 Insurgency in the Philippines
 Peace process with the Bangsamoro in the Philippines

References

Notes

Islamism in the Philippines
Jihadist groups
Military history of the Philippines
Moro conflict
Separatism in the Philippines